Kent Devlin Kramer (born July 21, 1944) is a former American football tight end in the National Football League (NFL) for the San Francisco 49ers, New Orleans Saints, Minnesota Vikings, and the Philadelphia Eagles.  He attended and played college football at the University of Minnesota.

Kramer attended Temple City High School in Temple City, California where he played varsity football for three years and was an All-CIF pick in 1961 for the undefeated Rams.

1944 births
Living people
Minnesota Golden Gophers football players
San Francisco 49ers players
New Orleans Saints players
Minnesota Vikings players
Philadelphia Eagles players
Players of American football from  Los Angeles